Christian Robert Santos Freire (born 24 March 1988) is a Venezuelan professional footballer who plays as a forward for Spanish club Unionistas.

Club career

Early career
Born in Ciudad Guayana, Bolívar, Santos moved to Germany at the age of six as his father received a new job in the country. After starting his career at SV Lippstadt 08 he moved to Arminia Bielefeld in 2003, and made his senior debut for the latter's reserve team on 6 May 2007, coming on as a late substitute in a 3–0 Oberliga Westfalen home win against Sportfreunde Lotte.

Santos scored his first senior goal on 1 April 2009, netting his team's second in a 3–1 away win against Delbrücker SC. After failed to make a single appearance with the first team, he left the club in 2011.

Belgium
On 9 August 2011, Santos signed for KAS Eupen in the Belgian Second Division. He scored a 15 goals during his first season, and added a further ten in his second.

In April 2013, Santos moved to Belgian Pro League club Waasland-Beveren, but failed to appear in a single match due to a severe knee injury.

NEC
In July 2014, Santos signed a one-year contract with Dutch Eerste Divisie side NEC Nijmegen, after impressing on a trial basis. He made his professional debut on 10 August, starting in a 3–1 home win against FC Eindhoven.

Santos scored his first professional goal on 15 August 2014, netting the last in a 2–0 win at FC Volendam. He finished the campaign with 23 goals in only 34 appearances, as his side achieved promotion to Eredivisie as champions; highlights included braces against FC Den Bosch, MVV Maastricht and FC Oss.

Santos made his debut in the main category of Dutch football on 12 August 2015, starting in a 1–0 home win against SBV Excelsior. He scored his first goals in the division on 18 September, netting all his team's goals in a 2–0 success over SC Heerenveen.

Santos added another doubles against ADO Den Haag (4–1 home win) and De Graafschap (2–0 home win), totalling 16 goals in 30 matches.

Alavés
On 12 July 2016, free agent Santos signed a three-year deal with Deportivo Alavés, newly promoted to La Liga. He made his debut in the league on 21 August, replacing Gaizka Toquero in a 1–1 away draw against Atlético Madrid.

Deportivo La Coruña
On 28 June 2018, Santos signed a two-year deal with Deportivo de La Coruña, after cutting ties with Alavés. He scored his first goal in an away match against Gimnàstic de Tarragona on 1 October 2018, one minute after entering as a substitute in 85th minute. On 27 January 2019, he scored a decisive goal in 2–1 away victory against Sporting de Gijón. On 18 August 2019, he scored a decisive goal in 88th minute after coming from the bench three minutes earlier in a 3–2 victory against Real Oviedo.

VfL Osnabrück
In September 2020, Santos returned to Germany joining 2. Bundesliga club VfL Osnabrück on a two-year contract.

Colo-Colo
In September 2021, Santos joined Colo-Colo in the Chilean Primera División. In June 2022, he ended his contract after making thirteen appearances and scoring a goal.

Juve Stabia
On 12 October 2022, Santos signed with Juve Stabia in the Italian third-tier Serie C until the end of the 2022–23 season.

Unionistas
On 1 February 2023, Santos joined Unionistas in the Spanish third-tier Primera Federación.

International career
After being allowed to play for Venezuela in January 2015, Santos made his full international debut on 27 March of that year, starting and being booked in a 2–1 friendly loss against Jamaica. He scored his first international goal on 13 October, but in a 3–1 2018 FIFA World Cup qualifiers loss against Brazil.

Santos was also included in Rafael Dudamel's 23-man list ahead of the Copa America Centenario. His first and only appearance of the tournament occurred on 13 June 2016, in a 1–1 draw against Mexico.

International goals
Scores and results list Venezuela's goal tally first, score column indicates score after each Santos goal.

Honours
NEC
Eerste Divisie: 2014–15

References

External links

Christian Santos profile at Voetbal International 

1988 births
Living people
People from Bolívar (state)
German people of Venezuelan descent
Venezuelan footballers
German footballers
Venezuela international footballers
Venezuelan expatriate footballers
German expatriate footballers
Association football forwards
2. Bundesliga players
Arminia Bielefeld players
VfL Osnabrück players
Regionalliga players
Arminia Bielefeld II players
Challenger Pro League players
K.A.S. Eupen players
Belgian Pro League players
S.K. Beveren players
Eredivisie players
Eerste Divisie players
NEC Nijmegen players
La Liga players
Deportivo Alavés players
Segunda División players
Deportivo de La Coruña players
Chilean Primera División players
Colo-Colo footballers
Serie C players
S.S. Juve Stabia players
Unionistas de Salamanca CF players
Copa América Centenario players
Venezuelan people of Polish descent
German expatriate sportspeople in Spain
Venezuelan expatriate sportspeople in Germany
Venezuelan expatriate sportspeople in Belgium
Venezuelan expatriate sportspeople in the Netherlands
Venezuelan expatriate sportspeople in Spain
Venezuelan expatriate sportspeople in Chile
Venezuelan expatriate sportspeople in Italy
Expatriate footballers in Germany
Expatriate footballers in Belgium
Expatriate footballers in the Netherlands
Expatriate footballers in Spain
Expatriate footballers in Chile
Expatriate footballers in Italy